Arangel is a village in the municipality of Kičevo, North Macedonia. It used to be part of the former municipality of Oslomej.

Demographics
As of the 2021 census, Arangel had 292 residents with the following ethnic composition:
Macedonians 278
Persons for whom data are taken from administrative sources 13
Others 1

According to the 2002 census, the village had a total of 709 inhabitants. Ethnic groups in the village include:
Albanians: 708
Others: 1

References

External links

Villages in Kičevo Municipality
Albanian communities in North Macedonia